This article lists important figures and events in Malaysian public affairs during the year 1971, together with births and deaths of notable Malaysians. Parliamentary government was restored on 5 February, after its 1969 suspension due to race riots.

Incumbent political figures

Federal level
Yang di-Pertuan Agong: Sultan Abdul Halim Muadzam Shah
Raja Permaisuri Agong: Sultanah Bahiyah
Prime Minister: Tun Abdul Razak
Deputy Prime Minister: Tun Dr Ismail
Lord President: Mohamed Azmi Mohamed

State level
 Sultan of Johor: Sultan Ismail
 Sultan of Kedah: Tunku Abdul Malik (Regent)
 Sultan of Kelantan: Sultan Yahya Petra (Deputy Yang di-Pertuan Agong)
 Raja of Perlis: Tuanku Syed Putra
 Sultan of Perak: Sultan Idris Shah II
 Sultan of Pahang: Sultan Abu Bakar
 Sultan of Selangor: Sultan Salahuddin Abdul Aziz Shah
 Sultan of Terengganu: Sultan Ismail Nasiruddin Shah
 Yang di-Pertuan Besar of Negeri Sembilan: Tuanku Jaafar
 Yang di-Pertua Negeri (Governor) of Penang: Tun Syed Sheh Barakbah
 Yang di-Pertua Negeri (Governor) of Malacca:
 Tun Haji Abdul Malek bin Yusuf (until August)
 Tun Haji Abdul Aziz bin Abdul Majid (from August)
 Yang di-Pertua Negeri (Governor) of Sarawak: Tun Tuanku Bujang Tuanku Othman
 Yang di-Pertua Negeri (Governor) of Sabah: Tun Pengiran Ahmad Raffae

Events
 5 January – Kuala Lumpur hit by flash floods. 22 people were killed.
 5 February – The Parliament government was restored after it was suspended during the Incident of 13 May 1969.
 20 February – Tuanku Abdul Halim Muadzam Shah of Kedah was installed as the fifth Yang di-Pertuan Agong.
 28 March – The 25th anniversary of the installation of Raja Syed Putra as Raja Perlis was celebrated.
 3 April – Malaysia Airlines Systems (MAS) was founded.
 15 May – Central Bank of Malaysia building officially opened.
 11 July – The Malaysian New Economic Policy was launched.
 9 September – The Star, a Malaysian newspaper, was founded.
 13 September – The 17th Commonwealth Parliamentary Conference was held in Kuala Lumpur.
 December – Flash floods hit Temerloh, Pahang.
 6–13 December – 1971 Southeast Asian Peninsular Games
 16 December – The 25th anniversary of the installation of Sultan Ismail Nasiruddin Shah as Sultan of Terengganu was celebrated.

Births
10 May – Amy Mastura – Malaysian singer and actress
4 June – Tengku Permaisuri Norashikin – former Radio Televisyen Malaysia (RTM) newscaster and current consort of Sultan Sharafuddin Idris Shah of Selangor
20 August – Hans Isaac – Malaysian entertainer
1 November – Azman Adnan – Malaysian footballer
18 November – Permaisuri Siti Aishah of Selangor and 11th Raja Permaisuri Agong
1 December – Jason Keng-Kwin Chan, Malaysian-Australian actor
Unknown date – Wazi Abdul Hamid – Malaysian motorcycle cub prix rider

Deaths
 15 June – Nordin Ahmad, Malay film actor and director

See also
 1971 
 1970 in Malaysia | 1972 in Malaysia
 History of Malaysia

 
Years of the 20th century in Malaysia
Malaysia
Malaysia
1970s in Malaysia